Yossi Bachar (born 9 April 1964) is an Israeli Major general (Aluf) who commands the IDF's General Staff Corps.

Military service
Bachar was drafted into the IDF in 1983. He volunteered as a paratrooper in the Paratroopers Brigade, and in 1985 became an infantry officer after completing Officer Candidate School. During his career Bachar led the Brigade's Reconnaissance company, 101st "Peten" (Elapidae) paratroop battalion and Maglan Unit in counter-guerrilla operations in South Lebanon. During Operation Defensive Shield he commanded 55th Paratroopers Brigade and afterwards he led the 35th Paratroopers Brigade in counter-terror operations in the Second Intifada. Bachar was then assigned to command the Gaza Division. In September 2014 he was appointed as the commander of the IDF's General Staff Corps.

References

1964 births
Living people
Israeli generals
Jewish military personnel